The Mauritian friar (Amauris phoedon) is a species of nymphalid butterfly in the Danainae subfamily. It is endemic to Mauritius.

Adults have been recorded imbibing exudations from the ends of broken branches of Tournefortia argentea lying on the ground, presumably for the pyrrolizidine alkaloids that may be present in the exudations.

The larvae feed on Tylophora asthmatica.

References 

 Seitz, A. Die Gross-Schmetterlinge der Erde 13: Die Afrikanischen Tagfalter. Plate XIII 24 misspelling phaedon

Sources 

Amauris
Insects of Mauritius
Endemic fauna of Mauritius
Butterflies described in 1798
Butterflies of Africa
Taxonomy articles created by Polbot